Mohammad Hasibul Hossain (born 3 June 1977), known as Hasibul Hossain, played five Tests (2000–01) and 32 One-Day Internationals (1995–2004) for Bangladesh.

Hasibul made his ODI debut at Sharjah against Sri Lanka in 1995 at the age of 17. He celebrated his debut with the big wicket of Roshan Mahanama. The fastest bowler in the country, Hasibul continued on to play regularly for Bangladesh for a number of years. His best bowling performance in ODIs came at Dhaka in 1999 when he took 4 for 56 against Kenya. In 1999 he enjoyed a good Cricket World Cup in the UK. He took the first two wickets cheaply against Scotland at Edinburgh to help Bangladesh achieve their maiden World Cup win.

He played in Bangladesh's first first-class match, on the tour of New Zealand in 1997-98, in the innings loss to the Northern Conference team, when he stood out, taking 6 for 143, as well as taking Bangladesh's first first-class wicket and hitting Bangladesh's first first-class six. He later played in Bangladesh's first Test (bowling Bangladesh's first ball in Test cricket) and in four other Tests between November 2000 and December 2001, but with little success.

He had an outstanding season for Sylhet Division in 2005–06, when in nine first-class matches he took 57 wickets at an average of 16.00 to lead the national bowling aggregates and averages, taking five or more wickets in an innings seven times, and 10 or more wickets in a match twice. However, injuries and overstepping problems reduced his effectiveness, and he played his last first-class match for Sylhet in 2007.

References

External links

1977 births
Living people
Bangladeshi cricketers
Bangladesh Test cricketers
Bangladesh One Day International cricketers
Sylhet Division cricketers
Cricketers at the 1998 Commonwealth Games
Cricketers at the 1999 Cricket World Cup
People from Barlekha Upazila
Commonwealth Games competitors for Bangladesh